Donald Collins may refer to:

 Donald Collins (Maine politician) (1925–2018), American politician from Maine
 Donald Collins (Vermont politician) (born 1942), American politician from Vermont